Adam's Bridge Marine National Park is a national park surrounding Adam's Bridge (Rama's Bridge) in northern Sri Lanka, approximately  north west of Mannar.

History

An Integrated Strategic Environmental Assessment of Northern Province produced by the government with the assistance of United Nations Development Programme and United Nations Environment Programme and published in October 2014 recommended that a national park with an area of  be created on the Sri Lankan section of Adam's Bridge. In May 2015 the government announced that a part of Adam's Bridge, along with Chundikkulam, Delft and Madhu Road would be designated national parks. The Indian section of Adam's Bridge is part of the Gulf of Mannar Marine National Park.

Flora and fauna
Many migratory birds follow the Pamban Island-Adam's Bridge-Mannar Island route when flying to/from Sri Lanka. The sand dunes of Adam's Bridge are also used as breeding grounds by birds such as the brown noddy. Numerous varieties of fish and sea grasses thrive in the shallow waters Adam's Bridge. Sea life found around Adam's Bridge include dolphin, dugong and turtle.

See also
 Coral reefs in India

References

2015 establishments in Sri Lanka
Mannar DS Division
National parks of Sri Lanka
Protected areas established in 2015
Protected areas in Northern Province, Sri Lanka